The Battle of Saragossa, also known as the Battle of Zaragoza, took place on 20 August 1710 during the War of the Spanish Succession.  A Spanish Bourbon army loyal to Philip V of Spain and commanded by the Marquis de Bay was defeated by a Grand Alliance force under Guido Starhemberg. 

Despite this victory, which allowed Philip's rival Archduke Charles to enter the Spanish capital of Madrid, the allies were unable to consolidate their gains. Forced to retreat, they suffered successive defeats at Brihuega in November and Villaviciosa in December, which effectively ended their chances of installing Archduke Charles on the Spanish throne.

Background

The 1710 Spanish campaign opened on 15 May when the Spanish Bourbon army commanded by Philip V in person and Francisco Castillo Fajardo, Marquis of Villadarias, advanced on the town of Balaguer. Guido Starhemberg, commander of the Allied forces in Catalonia, halted this attempt by preventing the Spanish from fording the Segre river, a success in which the officers of the British contingent had a leading role. 

Having received reinforcements, in June Philip made another attempt upon Balaguer with 20,000 infantry and 6,000 cavalry, but was defeated at Almenar on 27 July. The allied troops had taken up a strong defensive position and repelled the Spanish attacks until the British commander, James Stanhope, leading their vanguard, broke the Spanish lines. Philip was forced to withdraw to Zaragoza, capital of Aragon, while Villadarias was replaced by the French general Alexandre Maître, Marquis de Bay.

On 9 August the Spanish army reached Zaragoza and de Bay positioned his troops with the river Ebro on his left and the Torrero heights to the right. On 15 August, an Allied cavalry attack was repulsed, followed by five days of minor skirmishes before the Allies crossed the Ebro in force on 19 August and were allowed to deploy during the night.

Battle
The two forces were roughly equal in strength, the allies having thirty-seven battalions of infantry and forty-three squadrons opposed to the Spanish-Bourbon army of thirty-eight battalions and fifty-four squadrons. The Allied left, composed of Catalonian and Dutch troops, was led by the Count of Atalaya, the right by Stanhope, made up of British, Portuguese and Austrian cavalry, with Starhemberg in charge of the centre, mainly German, Austrian and Spanish infantry.  

On 20 August at 08:00 an artillery-duel started which lasted four hours  before Stanhope charged the Bourbon-Spanish left. At first the Spanish and Walloon troops of the Bourbon army seemed to gain the advantage, having defeated a body of eight Portuguese squadrons, which they chased from the field. This opened a gap in the Bourbon lines, which opened a gap for Stanhope who scattered put to flight the disorganized Spanish soldiers, while at the centre and the right their attacks were repulsed.

The battle followed the same pattern as at Almenar, with the allies repulsing fierce Bourbon cavalry charges before counter-attacked with their infantry and pushing the Spanish back. In less than three hours, the Allies army won a comprehensive victory,  capturing the Bourbon artillery along with 73 standards. Between 5,000 or 6,000 Spanish soldiers were killed or wounded, and another 7,000 captured, with Allied losses estimated as 1,500 men dead or wounded.

Aftermath
Archduke Charles entered Zaragoza the next day. The defeat of the army of Philip V of Spain was severe, the way to Madrid was open. Philip V abandoned Madrid on 9 September and went to Valladolid. Archduke Charles entered a very hostile and almost empty Madrid on 28 September. Charles commented: "This city is a desert!" In the winter of 1710, Archduke Charles and the allied troops had to abandon Madrid, due to the great opposition of the people of Madrid and the dangerous strategic situation. After this, the British army suffered a defeat at the Battle of Brihuega, and the rest of the allied army was defeated at the Battle of Villaviciosa.

References

Sources
 Kamen, Henry. Felipe V, el rey que reinó dos veces. Ediciones Temas de Hoy S.A. Colección: Historia. Madrid (2000) 
 Albi, Julio. La Caballería española, un eco de clarines. Tabapress S.A. Madrid (1992) 
 
 
 Stanhope, Philip Henry. History of the War of the Succession in Spain. London, John Murray (1832).
 Cust, Edward (Sir). Annals of the wars of the eighteenth century: compiled from the most authentic histories of the period, Volume 1. London, Mitchell's military library (1858).

External links
Description of the Battles of Zaragoza (Spanish)

Conflicts in 1710
Saragossa
Saragossa
Saragossa
Saragossa
Saragossa
Saragossa
Saragossa
1710 in Spain